This is a list of Angolan banks.

The Banco Nacional de Angola (BNA), the Central Bank of Angola, is the supervising institution of all financial institutions in Angola, and has licensed 26 banks to offer banking to the Angolan market, which are listed in the table below.

Besides these 26 banks, BNA has authorized 71 Casa de Cambio, i.e. currency exchange businesses.

See also
List of Angolan companies
List of banks in Africa

References

External links
 BNA official website
 Angola: Central Bank Revokes Banco Kwanza License As of 18 January 2021.

Banks
Angola

Angola